Fort Independence is a granite bastion fort that provided harbor defenses for Boston, Massachusetts.  Located on Castle Island, Fort Independence is one of the oldest continuously fortified sites of English origin in the United States.  The first primitive fortification, called "The Castle", was placed on the site in 1634 and, after two re-buildings, replaced circa 1692 with a more substantial structure known as Castle William.  Re-built after it was abandoned by the British during the American Revolution, Castle William was renamed Fort Adams and then Fort Independence.  The existing granite fort was constructed between 1833 and 1851.  Today it is preserved as a state park and fires occasional ceremonial salutes. Fort Independence was added to the National Register of Historic Places in 1970.

History

Castle William

The site of Fort Independence has been occupied by various fortifications since 1634. The first fort to be constructed on Castle Island resulted from a visit by Governor John Winthrop; it was partly financed by him and the council. Construction was planned and supervised by Deputy Gov. Roger Ludlow and Captain John Mason of Dorchester, producing a "castle with mud walls" with masonry of oyster shell lime, in which cannon were mounted to defend the colonial town of Boston from attack by sea. The first commander of the fort was Captain Nicholas Simpkins in 1634. The first fort soon fell into disrepair and was rebuilt, mainly out of timber, in 1644 following a scare due to the arrival of a French warship in the harbor. The fort was reconstructed out of pine logs, stone, and earth, with 10-foot walls around a compound 50 feet square. The fort mounted six saker cannons and three smaller guns.  A later commander of the fort was Captain Richard Davenport, who supervised the post from 1645 until 1665 when he was struck by lightning within the fort and killed. His successor, Captain Roger Clap, commanded the fort from 1665–1686.

On 21 March 1673, the fort was destroyed by an accidental fire. It was rebuilt the next year in stone, with 38 guns and 16 culverins in the four-bastion main fort, along with six guns in a water battery. In 1689, following the Glorious Revolution in England, in which James II was replaced by William III, Governor Edmund Andros, a supporter of James II, was confined in the fort and sent to England to stand trial. Under Governor Sir William Phips, appointed by William III in 1692, the fort was renamed "Castle William" and re-built again. The new work had 54 cannon: 24 9-pounders, 12 24-pounders, and a total of 18 32- and 48-pounders.

From 1701 to 1703 the fort was further expanded. The new fort was designed by Wolfgang William Romer, the chief engineer of British forces in the American colonies. Its armament was nearly doubled to 100 guns. In 1740 a fifth bastion was added, mounting 20 42-pounders.

In the years leading up to the American Revolution, Castle William became a refuge for British officials during periods of unrest and rioting in Boston.  Violence in the wake of events such as the Stamp Act crisis in 1765 and the Boston Massacre in 1770 forced provincial leaders and British soldiers to take shelter within the fort. In September 1765 the stamps to be issued under the Stamp Act were kept at the fort.

As the American Revolution erupted in 1775, American forces quickly commenced the Siege of Boston and British forces made Castle William their primary stronghold.  It was not until the Continental Army led by George Washington managed the fortification of Dorchester Heights that Castle William was threatened and the British evacuated Boston in March 1776.  Before leaving Castle William, the British set fire to the fort, damaging or destroying it and its ordnance as best they could.

During the Revolutionary War, a fort called Fort Independence was built on Point Allerton in Hull. In 1797 the name was transferred to the former Castle William, apparently leaving the fort in Hull without a name. That fort fell into disuse after the War of 1812, or perhaps before. The site in Hull was named Fort Revere with a new fort built in the late 19th century.

Fort Adams
After it was evacuated, the fort was quickly re-built by American forces in 1776.  Although still referred to, at times, as Castle William, the fort was officially known as Fort Adams in the years following the Revolution.  In 1785, the legislature of Massachusetts designated the fort as a prison, in which capacity it served until 1805.

On 7 December 1797 (1799 in some sources), the fort was renamed Fort Independence during a ceremony attended by President John Adams.  The following year, the fortification and the island were turned over to the United States government.  The fort was re-built and expanded in 1800-1803 under the first system of US fortifications (some sources place it in the second system), as designed by French-born military engineer Jean Foncin. The Secretary of War's report on fortifications for December 1811 describes the fort as "...a regular pentagon, with bastions of masonry, mounting 42 heavy cannon, with two [additional] batteries for six guns...". During the War of 1812, a squadron of the British Royal Navy repeatedly captured American merchant and fishing vessels in Massachusetts Bay; however, they never attempted an attack on the port of Boston owing largely to the strength of Fort Independence.  Colonel John Breck, namesake of Brecksville, Ohio, was the Commandant of Fort Independence during the War of 1812.

Existing structure

Work on the present fort was to begin in 1833 under the third system of US fortifications, supervised by Colonel Sylvanus Thayer, one of the nation's leading military engineers of the time. However, commencement was delayed until 1836 due to funding problems cause by an inflation spike. It was constructed primarily out of granite from Rockport, Massachusetts. The re-built fort was substantially complete by 1848, although repairs and other work continued until 1861. A small part of Castle William's brick structure remains in the rear portion of the present fort, but is covered up by subsequent stonework.

At the start of the Civil War in 1861, Fort Independence was garrisoned by the Fourth Battalion Massachusetts Volunteer Militia. The battalion set the fort in order and were trained in infantry and artillery drill, eventually forming the nucleus of the 24th Regiment Massachusetts Volunteer Infantry. At least two other infantry regiments were trained at Fort Independence during the Civil War—the 11th Massachusetts and the 13th Massachusetts.

Following the Civil War, Fort Independence gradually fell out of use, as its importance was reduced by the larger Fort Warren which had also been constructed under the direction of Sylvanus Thayer. In the 1880s, landscape architect Frederick Law Olmsted designed a series of parkways and parks in Boston known as the Emerald Necklace. Olmsted had originally envisioned a parkway to be known as the Dorchesterway that would connect Castle Island (via a new earthen causeway) to the rest of the Emerald Necklace. The Dorchesterway was never realized; however, the city of Boston did undertake a large-scale project in the 1890s to create a park-like environment around Fort Independence. In 1890, Castle Island (excluding the fort) was ceded by the United States government. The city of Boston commenced filling the marshes separating Castle Island from South Boston in 1890 with the intention of creating green space and promenades. The process was finished in the 1920s and Castle Island ceased to be an island. The fort itself was ceded by the federal government to the city of Boston in 1908.

In 1898, during the Spanish–American War, the U.S. government briefly reclaimed Castle Island, however it was quickly returned to the city of Boston in 1899. The military again took control of Fort Independence during World War I and World War II and anti-aircraft guns were added. During World War I, the fort was used primarily as a depot for small arms ammunition and during World War II, it was used by the United States Navy as a degaussing station for de-magnetizing the hulls of ships. At the close of both conflicts, the fort was promptly returned to the custody of the city of Boston.

In 1962, the U.S. government permanently deeded Castle Island and Fort Independence to the Commonwealth of Massachusetts. It is now overseen by the Massachusetts Department of Conservation and Recreation and the non-profit Castle Island Association. Over the course of its history, a shot was never fired in anger from Fort Independence by United States forces.

Edgar Allan Poe and a duel
A persistent, though mostly apocryphal, story involving Fort Independence was allegedly the inspiration behind one of Edgar Allan Poe's most well known works.  A monument outside the west battery of the fort marks the former site of the grave of Lieutenant Robert F. Massie, who was killed in a sword duel with Lieutenant Gustavus Drane at the fort on December 25, 1817.

According to folklorist Edward Rowe Snow, Massie was so popular with the soldiers stationed at Fort Independence that they took out their frustration on his killer, Lieutenant Drane, by walling him up within a vault in the fort.  Edgar Allan Poe, while serving with the 1st United States Artillery Regiment at Fort Independence in 1827, purportedly heard the tale and was inspired by it, according to Snow, to write "The Cask of Amontillado".

The legend that purportedly inspired Poe is not, however, entirely accurate. The duel did, in fact, take place, but the victor, Lieutenant Drane, was not murdered by the fort's soldiers.  Drane, instead, continued in his military career, was later promoted to the rank of captain and died on active duty in 1846. After World War II, Lieutenant Massie's remains were moved to the Fort Devens Cemetery near the town of Ayer.

See also

National Register of Historic Places listings in southern Boston, Massachusetts
 List of military installations in Massachusetts

Notes

References

External links 

 A 1781 view of the channel into Boston Harbor (see top panel) that looks northward, with Castle William on the left and Governors Island on the right.

Boston Harbor
Independence
Independence
Independence
Independence
Independence
Buildings and structures in Boston
Independence
Parks in Boston
South Boston
National Register of Historic Places in Boston
1634 establishments in Massachusetts
American Civil War on the National Register of Historic Places
Defunct prisons in Massachusetts